Xiaole Shirley Liu (刘小乐) is a Professor in the Department of Data Sciences at the Dana–Farber Cancer Institute and Harvard T.H. Chan School of Public Health.

Education
She was educated at Stanford University where her thesis committee included , Jun S. Liu, Russ Altman, Patrick O. Brown and Rob Tibshirani.

Awards and honours
She was elected a Fellow of the International Society for Computational Biology (ISCB) in 2019 for her “outstanding contributions to the fields of computational biology and bioinformatics”.

References

American bioinformaticians
Year of birth missing (living people)
Living people
Stanford University alumni